Stanchfield Corner is an unincorporated community in Stanchfield Township, Isanti County, Minnesota, United States.

Notes

Unincorporated communities in Isanti County, Minnesota
Unincorporated communities in Minnesota